Richard Smith (1889 – 1939) was an English footballer who played for Stoke.

Career
Smith was born in Stoke-upon-Trent and played amateur football with Newcastle Town before joining Stoke in 1913. In his first season with the club Smith hit ten goals in the Southern League and managed the same amount the following season helping the club win the league and with it re-gaining their place in the Football League. He left the club at the end of the season and joined the army.

Career statistics

Honours
 Stoke
 Southern Football League Division Two champion: 1914–15

References

English footballers
Stoke City F.C. players
1889 births
1939 deaths
Newcastle Town F.C. players
Association football forwards